Claudine van der Straten-Ponthoz (Etterbeek, 25 September 1924 - Himalaya 2 October 1959) was a pioneering Belgian-French mountaineer, who died on October 2, 1959 while taking part in a women-only expedition to climb up 26,867-foot Mount Cho Oyu. She and the leader of the expedition, Mme Claude Kogan, and two Sherpa porters perished in an avalanche. Dorothea Gravina then took charge of the expedition.

Baroness Van der Straten-Ponthoz was a former skiing star and the daughter of the Belgian count Roger van der Straten Ponthoz (1888-1972).

See also
List of deaths on eight-thousanders
Chloé Graftiaux, Belgian female alpinist

References

1959 deaths
Female climbers
French mountain climbers
Belgian mountain climbers
French female mountain climbers
Belgian sportswomen
1924 births
20th-century French women